David Graves (born May 17, 1957) is a former Republican member of the Georgia House of Representatives, representing the 137th district from 1996 to 2005. Graves was a member of the Appropriations, Health & Human Services, Regulated Industries, and the Rules Committees.

Resignation
Graves resigned in 2005, shortly after his second DWI arrest, and his subsequent attempt to claim legislative immunity, which was rejected. He was sentenced to 10 days in jail, fined $1,600, 20 days of home confinement, 240 hours of community service, and alcohol counseling. His driver's license was suspended for 12 to 18 months. He did not run for re-election.

References

1947 births
Living people
Members of the Georgia House of Representatives
Georgia (U.S. state) politicians convicted of crimes